Vladimir Bogoevski (born 1 December 1953) is a Yugoslav volleyball player from Skopje, North Macedonia. He competed for Yugoslavia in the volleyball men's tournament at the 1980 Summer Olympics.

References

External links
 

1953 births
Living people
Macedonian men's volleyball players
Olympic volleyball players of Yugoslavia
Volleyball players at the 1980 Summer Olympics
Sportspeople from Skopje